The 6th PGA Golden Laurel Awards, honoring the best film and television producers of 1994, were held at the Regent Beverly Wilshire Hotel in Los Angeles, California on March 8, 1995. The nominees were announced on January 26, 1995.

Winners and nominees

Film

Television

Special

References

 1994
1994 film awards
1994 television awards